Portraits of Past was an American post-hardcore band from the San Francisco Bay Area that existed roughly from 1994–1995. The genre of music that they helped create is often described as "screamo," though that term was not used at the time the band was active. As Kent McClard recounts on the Ebullition website, the band's popularity grew only a couple of years after their demise at the end of 1995.

Former members of the band later formed other projects such as Nexus Six, Seventeen Queen, The Audience, Funeral Diner, Vue, Bellavista and …Who Calls So Loud and iwrotehaikusaboutcannibalisminyouryearbook.

Portraits of Past played a number of reunion shows in the second half of 2008. A new song was played at two California and two New York shows. Of the new song, lead vocalist Rob Pettersen has said, "We are not sure if other songs will be written or how/if we will release it/them. Nothing is ruled out, however… "

New material did eventually surface on an EP, Cypress Dust Witch, which was released by Excursions Into The Abyss on October 20, 2009.

Discography
Studio albums
01010101 (1996, Ebullition)

EPs
Demo Tape (1993, Self-released)
Portraits of Past/Bleed split 7-inch (1994, Ebullition)
Cypress Dust Witch CD/12" (2009, Excursions Into The Abyss)

Compilation albums
Portraits of Past discography CD (2008, Ebullition)

Compilation appearances
XXX: Some Ideas Are Poisonous (1995, Ebullition) – "Sticks Together"
Stealing The Pocket (1995, Positively Punk) – "The Song With The Slow Part"

Notes

External links
Portraits of past official MySpace page
www.portraitsofpast.com Portraits of Past official site
www.ebullition.com Ebullition Records
 IMPOSE magazine article
Excursions Into The Abyss label

Emo musical groups from California
American screamo musical groups
Musical groups established in 1994
Musical groups disestablished in 1995